Massachusetts House of Representatives' 14th Suffolk district in the United States is one of 160 legislative districts included in the lower house of the Massachusetts General Court. It covers parts of Boston in Suffolk County. Democrat Angelo M. Scaccia has represented the district since 1995. Candidates for this district seat in the 2020 Massachusetts general election include Gretchen Van Ness.

The current district geographic boundary overlaps with those of the Massachusetts Senate's Norfolk and Suffolk district, 1st Suffolk district, and 2nd Suffolk district.

Representatives
 E. James 
 James T. Brett 
 Angelo Scaccia
 Robert Consalvo

See also
 List of Massachusetts House of Representatives elections
 Other Suffolk County districts of the Massachusetts House of Representatives: 1st, 2nd, 3rd, 4th, 5th, 6th, 7th, 8th, 9th, 10th, 11th, 12th, 13th, 15th, 16th, 17th, 18th, 19th
 List of Massachusetts General Courts
 List of former districts of the Massachusetts House of Representatives

Images

References

Further reading

External links
 Ballotpedia
  (State House district information based on U.S. Census Bureau's American Community Survey).
 League of Women Voters of Boston

House
Government of Suffolk County, Massachusetts
Government of Norfolk County, Massachusetts